Epoch: Evolution is the 2003 TV-movie sequel to Epoch, directed by Ian Watson with David Keith reprising his role from the original film.

Plot
Engineer Mason Rand (David Keith) returns to help determine if the mysterious monolith he had studied earlier can be used to help save Earth from destruction, or if it is in fact causing it.

Cast
Source:
 David Keith as Dr. Mason Rand 
 Billy Dee Williams as Ferguson
 Angel Boris as Sondra
 Brian Thompson as Captain Tower
 Velizar Binev as Father Samuel
 Biliana Petrinska as  General Gordeova
 Atanas Srebrev as Man

Release
Epoch: Evolution premiered as a Sci Fi Pictures original telefilm on the Sci Fi Channel. It was released on DVD on May 4, 2004.

References

External links
 

2003 films
2003 science fiction films
2003 television films
Films shot in Bulgaria
Syfy original films
American science fiction films
2000s American films